Joseph Ernest Murray (born 5 November 1971) is an English former footballer who played as a midfielder. Whilst he mostly played for non-league Marine, he made appearances in the English Football League for Wrexham in the 1990–91 season under non-contract terms.

References

1971 births
Living people
Footballers from Liverpool
English footballers
Association football midfielders
Marine F.C. players
Wrexham A.F.C. players
English Football League players